Støvring is a town in Rebild municipality in Region Nordjylland in the geographic region of the Jutland peninsula known as Himmerland in northern Denmark. The town has a population of 9,089 (2022), and is one of the centres of industry and retailing in the area. It is the municipal seat of Rebild municipality. Støvring is the 8th biggest town/city in Region Nordjylland. Støvring is served by Støvring railway station, located on the Randers–Aalborg railway line. It is located 21 km from Aalborg and 37 km from Aars

History
In 1682 the village consisted of 12 farms and 8 houses without land. The total cultivated area amounted to 437.1 barrels of land due to 58.40 barrels of grains. The cultivation form was grassland with foxes.

In 1875 the city was described as follows: "Støvring with School, Watermill, Inn, 2 smaller shopping establishments and railway station.

The original Støvring station closed in 1974, but the station reopened in 2003 as a part of the new Aalborg Commuter Rail service.

Municipality
Until 1 January 2007 Støvring was also a municipality covering an area of 220 km², and with a total population of 13,057 (2005). Støvring municipality ceased to exist as the result of Kommunalreformen ("The Municipality Reform" of 2007).  It was merged with Nørager and Skørping municipalities to form the new Rebild municipality.  This created a municipality with an area of 628 km² and a total population of 28,457 (2005).

Notable people 
 Rikke Karlsson (born 1965) a Danish politician and MEP, lives in Støvring
 Michael Silberbauer (born 1981 in Støvring) a former professional footballer with 402 club caps, and 25 for Denmark

See also
 Hydrema – a dump truck manufacturer in Støvring founded in 1959.

References

 Municipal statistics: NetBorger Kommunefakta, delivered from KMD aka Kommunedata (Municipal Data)
 Municipal mergers and neighbors: Eniro new municipalities map

Municipal seats of the North Jutland Region
Municipal seats of Denmark
Cities and towns in the North Jutland Region
Former municipalities of Denmark
Rebild Municipality